During World War II and immediately after it, in addition to the many private films created to help the war effort, many Allied countries had governmental or semi-governmental agencies commission propaganda and training films for home and foreign consumption. Animated films are not included here.

British Empire and Commonwealth

United Kingdom

1939

1940

1941

1942

1943

1944

1945

Australia
In Australia the Australian News and Information Bureau, under the Department of Information, produced the following

Canada
In Canada, the National Film Board of Canada either distributed or produced the following as part of its Canada Carries On and The World in Action series.

1940

1941

1942

1943

1944

1945

India

United States
The United States had the largest film industry of any of the Allied powers, and its use for propaganda purposes is legendary. Because it was so big, there was no single governmental or semi-governmental agency that centrally controlled it. Instead, the Office of War Information co-ordinated efforts among many entities to produce propaganda:

OCIAA: Office of the Coordinator of Inter-American Affairs

OEM: Office for Emergency Management

OSS: Office of Strategic Services

USAAF: United States Army Air Forces

USASC: U.S. Army Signal Corps

USASSD: U.S. Army Special Service Division

USDA: United States Department of Agriculture

USDT: United States Department of Treasury

USN: United States Navy

USDW: United States Department of War

WACMPI: War Activities Committee of the Motion Pictures Industry

Several of these films, although they have propaganda value, were used as training films for the United States armed forces.

1941  
Pre-December films given IMDb release date where available.

1942  

The 1942 Academy Award for Best Documentary, whose time frame included part of 1943, was split among four films, including the two seen here. Also, that year saw the amalgamation of the feature and short subject documentary categories into a single category.

1943

1944

1945

1946

1947

Year uncertain

Netherlands and Belgium
The low countries were overrun by Nazi Germany in the May–June 1940 blitzkrieg. The Dutch East Indies, the Netherlands most important colony, was conquered by Japan in early 1942. However each had a government in exile which set up the Belgian Ministry of Information and Netherlands Information Bureau, which produced the following films. There were also films made by the resistance while the respective countries were occupied.

Soviet Union
In the Soviet Union, unless otherwise noted, the Central Newsreel Studio produced these films.

Soviet films made for foreign markets
In addition to the above, the Soviet cinema distributing company, Artkino, produced the following for foreign markets.

See also
List of films based on war books
List of films made in the Third Reich
List of Holocaust films
List of World War II films

References

Lists of World War II films

 
Works about the United States Marine Corps
Articles containing video clips